Issy-l'Évêque is a commune in the Saône-et-Loire department in the region of Bourgogne-Franche-Comté in eastern France.

Personalities
Irène Némirovsky (1903-1942), the Ukrainian-Jewish-French novelist lived there during part of World War II; she was arrested in Issy-l'Évêque on 13 July 1942.

See also
Communes of the Saône-et-Loire department

References

Communes of Saône-et-Loire